There have been 43 coaches in the 116-year history of the South Fremantle Football Club, a West Australian Football League (WAFL) club.

The longest serving coach is Clive Lewington who coached the club for 11 seasons, winning the premiership four times. John Todd (one premiership), Mal Brown (one premiership), John Dimmer (two premierships) and Joe Coates (two premierships) each coached the team in eight seasons.

Coaches

References

South Fremantle Football Club coaches

South Fremantle Football Club coaches
Fremantle-related lists